The Roman Catholic Diocese of Vélez is a diocese located in the city of Vélez in the Ecclesiastical province of Bucaramanga in Colombia.

History
 14 May 2003: Established as Diocese of Vélez from the Diocese of Socorro y San Gil

Ordinaries
Luis Albeiro Cortés Rendón (May 14, 2003 – November 30, 2015), appointed Auxiliary Bishop of Pereira
Marco Antonio Merchán Ladino (October 26, 2016 – present)

See also
Roman Catholicism in Colombia

Sources

External links
 Catholic Hierarchy
 GCatholic.org

Roman Catholic dioceses in Colombia
Roman Catholic Ecclesiastical Province of Bucaramanga
Christian organizations established in 2003
Roman Catholic dioceses and prelatures established in the 21st century